This is a list of years in England, including the Kingdom of England (927–1649, 1660–1707), Commonwealth of England (1649–1653, 1659–1660), The Protectorate (1653–1659) and England as part of the Kingdom of Great Britain and United Kingdom (from 1707).

10th century

11th century

12th century

13th century

14th century

15th century

16th century

17th century

18th century

19th century

20th century

21st century

See also 
List of years in the United Kingdom
List of years in Northern Ireland
List of years in Scotland
List of years in Wales
Timeline of English history

 
England